Imre Csiszár is a Hungarian mathematician with contributions to information theory
and probability theory. In 1996 he won the Claude E. Shannon Award, the highest annual
award given in the field of information theory. 

He was born on February 7, 1938, in Miskolc, Hungary. He became interested in mathematics
in middle school. He was inspired by his father who was a forest engineer and was among the first to use mathematical techniques in his area. 
He studied mathematics at the Eötvös Loránd University, Budapest, and received his Diploma in 1961. He got his PhD in 1967 and the scientific degree Doctor of Mathematical Science in 1977. 

Later, he was influenced by Alfréd Rényi, who was very active in the area of probability theory. In 1990 he was elected Corresponding Member of the Hungarian Academy of Sciences, and in 1995 he became Full Member. Professor Csiszar has been with the Mathematical Institute of the Hungarian
Academy of Sciences since 1961. He has been Head of the Information Theory Group there since 1968, and presently he is Head of the Stochastics Department. He is also Professor of Mathematics at the L. Eotvos University, Budapest. He has held Visiting Professorships at various universities including Bielefeld University, Germany (1981), University of Maryland, College Park (several times, last in 1992), Stanford University (1982), University of Virginia (1985–86), etc. He has been Visiting Researcher at the University of Tokyo in 1988, and at NTT, Japan, in 1994. He is married and has four children.

He is a Fellow of the IEEE, and is a member of several other learned societies, including the Bernoulli Society for Mathematical Statistics and Probability. He has received several academic awards, including the Book Excellence Award of the Hungarian Academy of Sciences for his 1981 Information Theory monograph, the 1988 Paper Award of the IEEE Information Theory Society, the 2015 IEEE Richard Hamming Medal and the Academy Award for Interdisciplinary Research of the Hungarian Academy of Sciences in 1989.

Books 
 With János Körner: Information Theory: Coding Theorems for Discrete Memoryless Systems, Academic Press 1981, 2nd edition Cambridge University Press 2011.
 With Paul C. Shields: Information Theory and Statistics: A Tutorial, Now Publishers, Inc., 2004.

External links

Announcement of IEEE 2015 Hamming Medal

Members of the Hungarian Academy of Sciences
20th-century Hungarian mathematicians
1938 births
Living people
Information theorists
Probability theorists
Academic staff of Bielefeld University
Fellow Members of the IEEE